Ralph Eleaser Whiteside Earl (born 1785–1788; died Nashville, Tennessee September 16, 1838), was an American painter known as the "court painter" to President Andrew Jackson. He also painted the portrait of Rachel Jackson.

Biography
Earl was the son of portrait painter Ralph Earl and his second wife Ann Whiteside, and thus a member of the prominent Earle family.  He was born c. 1785–1788, probably in New York City, and likely received his early training in portraiture from his father, whose naive style is reflected in the younger Earl's earliest works.  He traveled to London in 1809, where he studied for a year with John Trumbull and was advised by Benjamin West to learn perspective, anatomy, and three-dimensional illusion. He remained in England until 1814, living with his maternal grandfather and uncle in Norwich and executing portrait commissions. He then traveled to Paris before returning to the United States in December 1815 to create grand-scale history paintings on the European model.

As preparation for a planned project depicting the Battle of New Orleans, Earl met General Andrew Jackson and visited him at his Tennessee home, The Hermitage, in January 1817. Earl painted portraits of Jackson and his family and married Mrs. Jackson's niece Jane Caffery on May 19, 1819.  She died in childbirth in 1820, as did their son.

After his wife's death, Earl became Jackson's close friend and lived with him at The Hermitage. When Jackson became President in 1829, Earl accompanied him to the White House, painting so many portraits of Jackson that he became known as the "Court Painter" and "the King's painter". Earl returned to Tennessee with Jackson after his second term of office and died at The Hermitage on September 16, 1838.

Controversy
The City Council of Salem, Massachusetts unanimously voted on October 25, 2022, to remove a painting of Andrew Jackson, painted by Earl, from the chambers. During the meeting, City council member Caroline Watson-Felt said, "He needs to land somewhere with a giant Scarlet Letter on him. "I'm absolutely for the removal of him from this room. ... I don’t want to miss an opportunity to very clearly own and look our atrocious history as white Americans in its face."

Works

References

1780s births
1838 deaths
19th-century American painters
American male painters
American portrait painters
Painters from New York City
19th-century American male artists